Barnacle Bill is a  rock on Mars in Ares Vallis. It was the first rock on Mars analyzed by the Sojourner rover using its Alpha Proton X-ray Spectrometer. The encounter occurred during Sol 3 of the Mars Pathfinder mission on the surface of Mars and took ten hours to complete.

Early analysis of data sent from Sojourner led scientists to speculate that the rock was andesite.

The name was inspired in mission scientists by barnacle-like structures on the rock that appeared in transmitted photos.

See also
List of rocks on Mars
Yogi Rock

External links
 Mars Pathfinder Science Results

Rocks on Mars
Mars Pathfinder